Makiko is a feminine Japanese given name. Notable people with the name include:

Makiko Esumi (born 1966), Japanese model, actress, writer, essayist, and lyricist
Makiko Fujino (born 1949), Japanese politician of the Liberal Democratic Party
Makiko Furukawa (born 1947), Japanese former volleyball player
Makiko Horai (born 1979), former Japanese volleyball player
, Japanese long-distance runner
Makiko Kikuta (born 1969), Japanese politician of the Democratic Party of Japan
Makiko Kuno (born 1967), Japanese actress
, Japanese speed skater
Makiko Ōmoto (born 1973), female voice actor from Kurashiki, Okayama Prefecture, Japan
Makiko Tanaka (born 1944), Japanese politician, the daughter of former Prime Minister Kakuei Tanaka
Makiko Tomita (born 1991), Japanese rugby sevens player
, Japanese actress
, Japanese hurdler

Fictional characters
Makiko Nagi, a character in the manga series Tenjho Tenge

Japanese feminine given names